The 1993 Victorian Football Association season was the 112th season of the Australian rules football competition. The premiership was won by the Werribee Football Club, after it defeated Port Melbourne in the grand final on 19 September by 42 points; it was the first and, as of 2018, only premiership won by the club in either division.

Association membership
Leading up to the season, the Dandenong Football Club's financial troubles threatened to destroy the club. Its financial position had been weak since the 1980s; and the heavy spending which delivered it the 1991 premiership had worsened the situation, having not resulted in enough of a revenue boost to reverse the situation. The club was more than $220,000 in debt, including a $38,000 debt to the Dandenong Council which threatened its tenancy of Shepley Oval. Less than two weeks before the start of the season, the club succeeded in securing another lease for Shepley Oval. A few days later, the club announced a controversial plan to deal with its debt: it would liquidate the club, then immediately establish a new and legally distinct debt-free club which carried the same on-field team forward. The new club was known as Dandenong Redlegs Ltd, and the onfield team remained known as the Dandenong Redlegs, as it had been prior to the liquidation; a new guernsey, still incorporating its traditional navy blue and red colours, was adopted. Several other clubs were unimpressed with Dandenong's actions, worrying that it damaged the credibility of the Association clubs as a whole and would make it more difficult for them to obtain credit in the future.

Administrative structure
In May, the clubs voted to disband the Association's Board of Directors, handing over complete administration of the Association to the Board of Management and streamlining the process by taking the clubs entirely out of it. Since the changes made in 1988, the Association had been administered by a six-man Board of Management which was elected by but independent from the clubs; but, decisions could be vetoed by a 75% majority vote of the Board of Directors, which comprised one delegate from each club.

Premiership season
In the home-and-away season, each team played eighteen games; the top five then contested the finals under the McIntyre final five system. Finals were played at Moorabbin Oval, and the grand final was played at Princes Park.

Ladder

Finals

Awards
The leading goalkicker for the season was Jack Aziz (Werribee), who kicked 97 goals including finals.
The J. J. Liston Trophy was won by Michael Sinni (Prahran), who polled 19 votes. Sinni finished ahead of David King (Port Melbourne), who was second with 18 votes; and Simon Clark (Springvale), Mark Lisle (Box Hill) and Paul Williams (Frankston), who finished equal-third with 15 votes apiece.
The Fothergill-Round Medal was won by Adam Williams (Sandringham).
Sandringham won the seconds premiership. Sandringham 11.13 (79) defeated Box Hill 5.7 (37) in the grand final, held as a curtain-raiser to the Seniors Grand Final on 19 September.
Werribee won the inaugural pre-season competition. Werribee 29.21 (195) defeated Sandringham 14.18 (102) in the grand final, held on 11 April at Beach Oval.

Notable events
During the offseason, John Grieve was replaced as president of the Association by former Williamstown president Tony Hannebery. Grieve had served as president since April 1988.
Three of the five games played on Sunday 20 June were decided by one point: Box Hill 13.15 (93) d. Prahran 13.14 (92); Oakleigh 17.16 (118) d. Coburg 17.15 (117); and, Springvale 9.17 (71) d. Williamstown 10.10 (70).
On Sunday 15 August, Bill Swan (Williamstown) played his 301st senior Association game, passing the record set by Fred Cook (300 games) to become the games record holder in Association history. Swan still holds this record as of 2019.
In the preliminary final, Werribee came back from a 17-point deficit midway through the final quarter to defeat Springvale. Jack Aziz, who also kicked the penultimate goal, scored the match-winning goal seconds before the final siren with a set shot from 50 metres. The goal ended a strong season recovery by Springvale, which had lost its first five games before recovering to play finals.

See also
List of VFA/VFL Premiers
 Australian Rules Football
 Victorian Football League

References

Victorian Football League seasons
VFL